Calvin Coolidge Worthington (November 27, 1920 – September 8, 2013) was an American car dealer, best known on the West Coast of the United States for his offbeat radio and television advertisements for his Worthington Dealership Group, an car dealership chain that covered the western and southwestern U.S. at it's peak and later for his minor appearances and parodies in a number of movies.  He first rose to fame for his unique radio and television advertisements for the Worthington Dealership Group, most of which began with the announcement "Here's Cal Worthington and his dog Spot!"—though "Spot" was never a dog. Often, Spot was a tiger, a seal, an elephant, a chimpanzee, or a bear.  In one ad, "Spot" was a hippopotamus, which Worthington rode in the commercial. On some occasions, "Spot" was a vehicle, such as an airplane on whose wings Worthington would be seen standing while airborne. "Spot" was officially retired in the mid-1980s; however he was mentioned occasionally in later commercials.

According to a profile published in the Sacramento Bee in 1990, Worthington grossed  in 1988, making him at the time the largest single owner of a car dealership chain. His advertising agency, named Spot Advertising, had Worthington as its only client and spent  on commercials, the most of any auto dealer at the time. He sold automobiles from 1945 until his death and owned a  ranch located in Orland, California, north of Sacramento.

Early life
Calvin Coolidge Worthington was born on November 27, 1920 in the now-defunct town of Bly, Oklahoma, three weeks after his namesake, Calvin Coolidge, had been elected Vice President of the United States.  Worthington grew up in grinding poverty, one of nine children, and dropped out of school at the age of 13. His first job was as a water boy on a road construction crew for 15 cents an hour. He joined the Civilian Conservation Corps at age 15.

World War II
At the beginning of World War II, Worthington enlisted in the Army Air Corps. Commissioned a Second Lieutenant, he was the aerobatics champion at Goodfellow Field in San Angelo, Texas. He saw combat as a B-17 Flying Fortress pilot with the 390th Bomb Group, flying 29 missions over Germany. He was discharged after the war as a captain. Worthington was awarded the Air Medal five times, and received the Distinguished Flying Cross, which was presented to him by General Jimmy Doolittle.

Worthington's military service was frequently revisited in the 21st century in aviation magazines, since he had trained pilots who would become some of America's first astronauts.

Business career

Early years
After leaving the Army, Worthington wanted to become a commercial pilot, but could not because he was not a college graduate. He sold his car for $500 to purchase a gas station in Corpus Christi, Texas, which was unsuccessful, but sold it for what he had paid, an indication of future sales success. He then sold used cars in front of the post office in Corpus Christi, making a folksy pitch to people who stopped to pick up their mail. He moved to a dirt lot, where he made a $500 profit in one week by selling just three cars. He decided car sales would be his career.

Move to California
In 1949, Worthington moved to Huntington Park, California, establishing a Hudson Motor Car dealership. Early on, he entered the nascent field of television advertising, purchasing time for a three-hour live country music TV show every Saturday and Sunday on Los Angeles TV station KTLA, which eventually was entitled Cal's Corral.  A regular on the show was the flamboyant and eccentric singer and Hawaiian guitar player Jenks "Tex" Carman. When television became more established and sponsorship of entire programs subsequently became unfeasible, he became a Ford dealer with one-minute and 30-second commercials.

By the 1970s, Worthington was saturating the commercial breaks during the overnight hours on four of the seven television stations in Los Angeles, which had agreed to fill their overnight schedules by playing movies. Worthington's commercials could be seen breaking into old movies overnight, from midnight to six o'clock.

One of Worthington's rivals in the early 1960s was Chick Lambert, a well-known salesman with Brand Motors Ford City.  As the dealership's television pitchman, Lambert always introduced "my dog, Storm" (a large German Shepherd dog) as a prop in the commercials.  Storm would be seen either lounging on the hood of a car, sitting behind the wheel, or walking with his owner along the rows of cars. By the mid-1960s, Lambert had taken his dog act to Ralph Williams Ford (previously Leon Ames Ford), becoming well known for Storm and his intro, "Some people call this a commercial; I call it an invitation."  Worthington livened up the commercial wars by countering with the first of his "dog Spot" ads, a gorilla that roared. The response was so positive that a new campaign was born, featuring "Cal Worthington and his dog Spot!".

Expansion across the West Coast
The physical reach of the Worthington Dealership Group would eventually cover a large portion of the American Southwest and West. The company at its peak had 29 dealerships. Among the markets served by Worthington included Anchorage, Alaska; Phoenix, Arizona; Carlsbad, Claremont, Folsom, Long Beach, Sacramento and South Gate, California; Reno, Nevada; Houston and Sugar Land, Texas; and Federal Way, Washington.  The company closed their Long Beach location, their last remaining dealership, in February 2023.

The company entered the Anchorage market at a frenzied time in 1976, during the height of the construction of the Trans-Alaska Pipeline System.  In fact, the appearance in Alaska of a well-heeled California businessman coincidental with oil-related prosperity often entered the consciousness of Alaskans during those years, though Worthington was not the only businessman who fell under this category.  Worthington purchased an existing dealership, Friendly Ford, from the Stepp family, who continued to operate the city's Lincoln–Mercury dealership for many years afterward.

He was one of the first to abandon the traditional stand-alone dealership in favor of "auto malls."

, he also owned three shopping centers and one office tower, grossing  a year.

"My Dog Spot" ads
For nearly a quarter-century, from the 1960s until the 1990s, Worthington ran a series of offbeat television and radio advertisements for his auto dealerships patterned loosely after the pioneering "oddball" advertisements of Earl "Madman" Muntz. They began as a parody of a competitor who appeared in advertisements with a puppy recently adopted from the pound. They were known as the "My Dog Spot" ads because each commercial would introduce "Cal Worthington and his dog Spot!" However, the "dog" was never a dog. In most cases, it was an exotic animal being led around on a leash, such as a tiger or elephant. These commercials began as a parody of a long-running series of commercials produced by salesman Chick Lambert, who worked for multiple Los Angeles-area Ford dealers over many years. These commercials invariably began with "I'm Chick Lambert, Sales Manager here at Ralph Williams Ford, and this is my dog, Storm."  Storm was a German Shepherd dog, and was usually lounging on the hood of the first car to be featured in the ad.

Worthington's commercials were seen on every television channel in Los Angeles throughout the 1960s and early 1970s, mostly through saturation advertising during the overnight hours. The commercials would be accompanied by a jingle set to the tune of If You're Happy and You Know It, with the lyrics re-written to the refrain of "If you want a car or truck, go see Cal, if you want to save a buck, go see Cal;" following this were several different versions of the lyrics, such as "Give a new car to your wife, she will love you all your life" or "I will stand upon my head until my ears are turning red," and ending with "Go see Cal, Go see Cal, Go see Cal". When the idea of a jingle was first pitched to him, it was conceptualized as slow with a big roll up of drums; Worthington disagreed and felt the song should be fast and wrote the lyrics and recorded the song himself (along with local friend country western singer songwriter Sammy Masters). The jingle was successful. In the years following, Worthington discovered that there were children who thought that his name was "Go see Cal." Others managed to mondegreen as "Pussycow."

Among the many creatures that were featured as "Spot" were a killer whale from SeaWorld, a lion, an elephant, a goose, a tiger, a bull,  various snakes, a rhinoceros, a skunk, a bear, a roller-skating chimpanzee, a carabao (water buffalo), and a hippopotamus.
In addition to the many animals that were featured, one of Cal Worthington's "Spots" was Deacon Jones, at the time one of the "Fearsome Foursome" of the NFL's Los Angeles Rams, who sang the "Go See Cal" jingle. Worthington made deals with two local circuses to obtain animals for the commercial shoots. He also made use of animals belonging to individuals who commonly leased them to film and television shoots in nearby Hollywood.

In some commercials, Worthington would claim he would do a stunt for a sale, such as eating a bug or "stand upon my head 'til my ears are turning red."  According to a spokesman for the Television Bureau of Advertising, Worthington "is probably the best known car dealer pitchman in television history."

Personal life and death
Worthington was married and divorced four times. He never owned a car, instead borrowing one for sale from his dealerships. Worthington said in 2007 that he disliked selling automobiles, but "just kind of got trapped in it after the war. I didn't have the skills to do anything else. I just wanted to fly."
In May 2010, Worthington appeared in a political advertisement for California State Assembly candidate Larry Miles. The commercial, a throwback to the "My dog Spot" days, featured Worthington and "Spot" with Miles.  Worthington maintained his pilot certificate and medical certification until just 2 years before his death and was type rated on the Lear Jet.

Worthington died on September 8, 2013, at age 92 at his ranch in Orland, California.

After Worthington's death, his grandson Nick Worthington was general manager of the Worthington automobile empire, and appeared in the commercials. The family sold the last car dealership, the original Long Beach location, in 2023 to concentrate on commercial real estate and agriculture.

Popular culture
Worthington appeared in film and on television portraying himself as a car dealer. In addition, his commercials have provided background in numerous films, and both the style of his commercials as well as his own personal appearance and manner of speech have been portrayed by other actors as well.

Films
 Worthington himself appeared as a car dealer in the 1973 film Save the Tiger.
 Worthington's ads were parodied in Marty Feldman's 1977 comedy feature film The Last Remake of Beau Geste.
 In the 1993 movie Made in America, the character of Hal Jackson, played by Ted Danson is based on Cal Worthington. He is a California-based car dealer who stars in his own outrageous commercials, accompanied by large, out of control animals.

Television
 Worthington made numerous appearances over the years on The Tonight Show Starring Johnny Carson.
 In a 1972 episode of the animated television series Wait Till Your Father Gets Home, Stanley buys a clunker from a dishonest used car salesman based on Cal Worthington.
 In 1974, the television series Emergency! featured an episode in which the paramedic stars of the show rescue a car salesman who is trapped inside a car with a tiger during a commercial shoot.

Notes

Bibliography

 Hemmings Classic Car, August 1, 2007 (reprinted on hemmings.com)
 Hintzberger, John. Seattle Times April 15, 1986, "Trustworthy or Trustless? Poll rates people in the public eye"
 Rivenburg, Roy. Los Angeles Times June 3, 2002, "Spot's Co-Star"
 Stanley, Don. Sacramento Bee January 14, 1990, "The Dealer: By Golly, Cal Worthington Went From Dirt-Poor Ranch Hand to Millionaire Car Czar"
 Woodroffe, Pam. Seattle Times April 6, 1986, "Cal Worthington's 'depressed'"

External links
 Official site
 The "My Dog Spot" ads made available online
 

1920 births
2013 deaths
American automobile salespeople
Businesspeople from Los Angeles
Businesspeople from Oklahoma
Civilian Conservation Corps people
Companies based in Los Angeles County, California
Ford people
People from Corpus Christi, Texas
People from Orland, California
People from Shidler, Oklahoma
Recipients of the Distinguished Flying Cross (United States)
United States Army Air Forces officers
United States Army Air Forces pilots of World War II